A list of airports in Saint Barthélemy, sorted by location.

Saint Barthélemy is an island in the eastern Caribbean Sea. Also known as Saint Barts, Saint Barths, or Saint Barth, it is one of four Leeward Islands that comprise the French West Indies. It became an overseas collectivity (collectivité d'outre-mer or COM) of France on February 22, 2007. Previously it was a French commune of Guadeloupe, which is an overseas region (région d'outre-mer) and overseas department (département d'outre-mer or DOM) of France.

ICAO location identifiers are linked to the airport's Aeronautical Information Publication (AIP), which is available online in Portable Document Format (PDF) from the French Service d'information aéronautique (SIA).



List

See also 

List of airports by ICAO code: T#Saint Barthélemy''
List of airports in France
Wikipedia: Airline destination lists: North America#Saint Barthélemy (France)

References

External links 
French Civil Aviation sites
 Aeronautical Information Service / Service d'information aéronautique (SIA)
 Aeronautical Information Publications (AIP)
 Union des Aéroports Français

 
Saint Barthelemy
Airports
Saint Barthelemy